Old Harbour High School is a high school in Old Harbour in Saint Catherine Parish, Jamaica. The principal is Lynton Weir.

References

External links

High schools in Jamaica